Usnea scabrata, the straw beard lichen, is a pale grayish-yellowish green, slender, pendant, branching from the base, unequally branching, shrubby fruticose lichen that grows from holdfasts on trees. It is warty with abundant isidia. It resembles Usnea filipendula.

References

scabrata
Lichen species
Lichens of North America
Lichens described in 1875
Taxa named by William Nylander (botanist)

{